Grant Union High School is a public high school in Sacramento, California, United States.

Notable alumni
Ken Ackerman, radio announcer
Devontae Booker, football player
Leon Brown, baseball player
Don Doll,  football player
Gene Filipski, football player
Aaron Garcia, football player
Ricky Jordan, baseball player
Leron Lee, baseball player
Viliami Moala, football player
James Sample, football player
Onterrio Smith, football player
Donté Stallworth, football player
Shaq Thompson, football player
Syd'Quan Thompson, football player
Walt Torrence, basketball player
Christian Tupou, football player
C.J. Wallace, football player
Paris Warren, football player
Worrell Williams, football player
George Wright, musician
Jay King, musician (Club Nouveau)

Timeline
2004 – The new Grant Union High School stadium opens.

2022 - New Grant Union High Sport Complex

References

External links
 
 Alumni Association
 Twin Rivers Unified School District
 

Public high schools in California
High schools in Sacramento, California
2004 establishments in California